The 1988 WCT Finals was a men's tennis tournament played on indoor carpet courts. It was the 18th edition of the WCT Finals and was part of the 1988 Nabisco Grand Prix. It was played at the Reunion Arena in Dallas, Texas in the United States from March 28 through April 4, 1988.

Final

Singles

 Boris Becker defeated  Stefan Edberg 6–4, 1–6, 7–5, 6–2
 It was Becker's 4th title of the year and the 22nd of his career.

See also
 Becker–Edberg rivalry

References

 
1988 Grand Prix (tennis)
1988 in sports in Texas
1988 in American tennis